Conrad Carlman (16 January 1891 – 19 July 1945) was a Swedish sculptor. His work was part of the sculpture event in the art competition at the 1932 Summer Olympics.

References

1891 births
1945 deaths
20th-century Swedish sculptors
Swedish male sculptors
Olympic competitors in art competitions
People from Karlskrona